The 51st government of Turkey (5 October 1995 – 30 October 1995) was a minority government led by Tansu Çiller.

Background
Both the 49th and 50th governments were True Path Party and Social Democratic Populist Party (SHP) coalition governments, but after SHP merged with Republican People's Party (CHP) and Deniz Baykal was elected as the new leader of CHP, CHP stipulated an earlier date for the scheduled elections, and the coalition came to end.

The government

Aftermath
The government couldn't receive the vote of confidence on 13 October 1995. For the next 17 days, it served as a caretaker government.

References

Democrat Party (Turkey, current) politicians
Cabinets of Turkey
1995 establishments in Turkey
Minority governments
1995 disestablishments in Turkey
Cabinets established in 1995
Cabinets disestablished in 1995
Members of the 51st government of Turkey
Democrat Party (Turkey, current)